Joseph Gerrard Craven (28 December 1903 – 1972) was an English footballer who played as a defender in the Football League between 1923 and 1937.

Career
Craven played for St. Augustine's, Stockport County, Preston North End and Swansea Town before joining Second Division side Port Vale in June 1934. After a run of eight games from the start of the 1934–35 season he picked up an injury and played just a further three games at The Old Recreation Ground before moving to Newport County at the end of the season. He later played for Accrington Stanley. After retiring from professional football he became the manager of the "works" football team Leyland Motors.

Career statistics
Source:

References

Footballers from Preston, Lancashire
English footballers
Association football defenders
Stockport County F.C. players
Preston North End F.C. players
Swansea City A.F.C. players
Port Vale F.C. players
Newport County A.F.C. players
Accrington Stanley F.C. (1891) players
Leyland Motors F.C. players
English Football League players
1903 births
1972 deaths